Physical urticaria is a distinct subgroup of the urticaria that are induced by an exogenous physical stimulus rather than occurring spontaneously. There are seven subcategories that are recognized as independent diseases. Physical urticaria is known to be painful, itchy and physically unappealing; it can recur for months to years of a person's life.

Signs and symptoms 
Urticaria are characterized by dermal edema (wheal, swollen) and erythema (flare, red), also known as hives. Hive lesions typically last less than 24 hours and are usually itchy (pruritic). Hives can appear anywhere on the body and they may change shape, move around, disappear and reappear over short periods of time.

Types of hives 

Acute urticaria (short-term): can develop suddenly and will last less than 6 weeks. About 1 in 6 people will have acute hives at one point in their life.

Chronic urticaria (long-term): can develop suddenly and will persist more than 6 weeks. This type of urticaria is uncommon and occurs in only 0.1% of the population. 20% of people with chronic urticaria report still having problems 10 years after its onset.

Causes 
The cause of physical urticaria is unknown but it has been suggested to be an autoimmune disease. Suggesting that antibodies, which are produced by the immune system to protect humans from foreign microbes, are binding to body tissue; damaging body tissue.

In some cases physical urticaria can be a symptom of an underlying health issue such as:
 Thyroid disease
 Hepatitis
 Infection
 Cancer
 Food allergies
 Atopy

Diagnosis

Sub-categories 
There are seven sub-categories of physical urticaria:
 delayed pressure urticaria (DPU)
 cholinergic urticaria (ChU) 
 cold urticaria (CU)
 solar urticaria (SU)
 Acute pressure urticaria  (AU)
 chronic idiopathic urticaria (CIU)
 symptomatic dermatographism urticaria (SDU) (most common)

Treatment 
Antihistamine agents are the typically prescribed drug for the treatment of physical urticaria. They block the effect of histamine, a compound produced by the body which forms a part of the local immune response consequently causing inflammation. Some research has suggested that the use antihistamines and antagonist in synergy are better for the treatment of physical urticarias.

The cascade of events that link the autoantibody-antigen reaction with the production and release of histamine is not well characterized. Therefore, the focus of treatment for physical urticaria has been on characterizing the effectiveness of antihistamines rather than analysis of receptor binding or the pathomechanisms.

See also 
 Urticarial syndromes
 Acquired C1 esterase inhibitor deficiency
 List of cutaneous conditions

References 

Urticaria and angioedema
Dermatologic terminology